This is a list of the 1984 PGA Tour Qualifying School graduates. 50 players earned their 1985 PGA Tour card through Q-School in 1984. The tournament was played over 108 holes at the La Quinta Hotel Golf Club, Dunes course, in La Quinta, California. The top 50 players split the $100,000 purse, with the winner earning $15,000. There was a six-man playoff among those that tied for 47th to determine the final four spots – Jim Hallet and Keith Parker were eliminated.

Sources:

References

PGA Tour Qualifying School
Golf in California
PGA Tour Qualifying School Graduates
PGA Tour Qualifying School Graduates